"Cloudy" is a song by American music duo Simon & Garfunkel from their third studio album, Parsley, Sage, Rosemary and Thyme (1966). It was co-written by Paul Simon and Bruce Woodley of the Seekers; that band later covered it on their 1967 album Seekers Seen in Green.  The Cyrkle released a version of the song on their 1966 debut album, Red Rubber Ball. The title track, Red Rubber Ball, was also written by the duo of Woodley/Simon.

Composition
"Cloudy" employs a "breezy, almost jazzy musical style," with its title serving as a "point of departure for [its] scattered, whimsical text."

References

Bibliography 
 

1966 songs
Songs written by Paul Simon
Songs written by Bruce Woodley
Simon & Garfunkel songs
The Cyrkle songs
Song recordings produced by Bob Johnston